The 2018 season was the Green Bay Packers' 98th season in the National Football League, their 100th overall and their 13th and final season under head coach Mike McCarthy. After missing the playoffs for the first time since 2008 and losing quarterback Aaron Rodgers to injury during their 2017 season, the Packers failed to improve their 7–9 record from last season and finished with a 6–9–1 record, their worst since 2008.

For the first time since 2007, Jordy Nelson did not play for the Packers as he signed with the Oakland Raiders via free agency during the offseason.

On January 7, 2018, Brian Gutekunst was named the new general manager, after Ted Thompson took over as the senior advisor to football operations.

On December 2, 2018, after a 4–7–1 start, Mike McCarthy was fired hours after the Packers’ Week 13 loss to the Arizona Cardinals and Joe Philbin was named as the interim head coach. After a loss to the Chicago Bears in week 15, the Packers were eliminated from the postseason for the second consecutive season. This was the first time the Packers missed the postseason in consecutive years since 2005 to 2006. This was also the first time the Packers suffered from consecutive losing seasons since 1990 to 1991, a year before Brett Favre's arrival.

Coaching moves
After missing the playoffs, the Packers made several coaching changes during its offseason, in addition to selecting Brian Gutekunst as the team's new GM. Notable coaching changes included:
 Dom Capers was fired as defensive coordinator, and replaced by former New York Jets defensive coordinator and Cleveland Browns head coach Mike Pettine.
 Edgar Bennett was fired as Offensive Coordinator, and replaced by Joe Philbin, who had previously served as the Packers Offensive Coordinator from 2007 to 2011.
 Mike Trgovac was fired as Defensive Line Coach, and replaced by Jerry Montgomery.
 Alex Van Pelt left as Quarterbacks Coach, and was replaced by Frank Cignetti Jr.
 Luke Getsy left as Receivers Coach, and was replaced by David Raih.

Player movements

Free agents
The league year and free agency started on March 14, 2018.

Trades

Additions

Subtractions

Draft

Draft trades
The Packers traded their first-round pick (14th overall) to New Orleans in exchange for New Orleans’ first-round pick (27th overall), fifth-round pick (147th overall), and 2019 first-round pick.
The Packers traded their first-round pick traded from the Saints (27th overall), a third-round pick (76th overall) and a sixth-round pick (186th overall) to Seattle in exchange for Seattle's 18th overall pick and a seventh-round pick (248th overall).
The Packers traded their fourth-round pick (101st overall), and a fifth-round pick (147th overall) to Carolina in exchange for Carolina's 3rd-round pick (88th overall).
The Packers traded their fourth- and fifth-round selections (114th and 150th overall), and cornerback Damarious Randall to Cleveland in exchange for Cleveland's fourth-and fifth-round selections (101st and 138th overall), and quarterback DeShone Kizer
The Packers were awarded four compensatory picks (133rd, 172nd, 174th and 207th overall).
The Packers traded linebacker Lerentee McCray to Buffalo in exchange for Buffalo's seventh-round selection (239th overall).

Undrafted free agent additions

Roster cuts
The roster was cut to 53 on September 1, 2018.

Staff

Final roster

Preseason
The preseason schedule was announced on April 11, 2018.

Regular season

Schedule
The regular season schedule was announced on April 19, 2018.

Note: Intra-division opponents are in bold text.

Game summaries

Week 1: vs. Chicago Bears

This was the Packers' first win from a 17-point deficit or more entering the 4th quarter in franchise history.

Week 2: vs. Minnesota Vikings

Week 3: at Washington Redskins

Week 4: vs. Buffalo Bills

Week 5: at Detroit Lions

Week 6: vs. San Francisco 49ers

Week 8: at Los Angeles Rams

Week 9: at New England Patriots

Week 10: vs. Miami Dolphins

Week 11: at Seattle Seahawks

Week 12: at Minnesota Vikings

Week 13: vs. Arizona Cardinals

This was the first home loss to the Cardinals since 1949. Hours after the game, Head Coach Mike McCarthy was fired by the Packers.

Week 14: vs. Atlanta Falcons

Week 15: at Chicago Bears

Week 16: at New York Jets

Week 17: vs. Detroit Lions
With the loss, the Packers closed out the season with a disappointing 6–9–1 record. This was the second straight year in which the Detroit Lions swept the Packers.

Standings

Division

Conference

Statistics

Starters

Offense

Defense

Team leaders

League rankings

Awards

References

External links

Green Bay
Green Bay Packers seasons
Green Bay Packers